Christopher Payne (born 15 September 1990) is an Australian football (soccer) player who plays for Sydney United 58 in the National Premier Leagues NSW

Club career
He finished his HSC at Narrabeen Sports High School.

Sydney FC
Payne played in all of Sydney's three trial matches and scored a double against his former club Manly United at Cromer Park. His first official competitive outing for Sydney FC came against Queensland Roar in the opening Pre-Season Cup match of the season. Sydney ended up winning the match 2–1 with Payne scoring Sydney's first to level the scores at 1–1 and as a consequence become the club's youngest ever player to score in a fully competitive match. He was officially transferred from Manly a week before the opening round of the 2008/09 season with Manly FC receiving $3000 for the transfer.

He scored his first goal for Sydney FC in the 3–1 victory against Newcastle Jets at EnergyAustralia Stadium. While playing against the Wellington Phoenix in the 2009/10 Preliminary final, he scored a controversial goal with his arm. Despite displaying good form during Sydney FC's Finals run, he was not offered a new contract, and went back to his junior club Manly United. On 28 June Payne signed a deal with North Queensland Fury for their following season.

North Queensland Fury

Payne scored his first goal for the Townsville club in their Round 1, 3–3 draw with Perth Glory. His goal leveled the scores in the first half at 1–1. He again scored against the Glory in the return match in Townsville, hitting a spectacular strike to the top corner of the Glory goal to open the scoring in the Fury's 2–1 win.
On 7 December 2010, as a result of the North Queensland Fury folding, it was confirmed Payne signed a two-year contract with the Newcastle Jets.

Newcastle Jets

Payne made his debut for the Jets, in a pre-season friendly against NSW Premier League club Sutherland Sharks, where he helped the Jets to a 2–1 victory, scoring in the first half. His first A-League appearance for the club came in the 2–1 loss to his former club Sydney FC at Ausgrid Stadium on 17 December 2011.

Despite having a year left on his contract, Payne's future at the Jets looks to be uncertain under new manager Gary van Egmond who has made it clear that Payne is not part of his squad plans, as he believes he is not good enough. It was revealed in January 2012, that the Jets and fellow A-League club Gold Coast United were preparing a 'trade' for Payne with Tahj Minniecon. However this move was thwarted, when Minniecon suffered a heel injury a week before the transfer was to go through, in a Youth League game against Sydney FC. It was announced on 3 February 2012 that Newcastle Jets and Payne had mutually agreed to terminate his contract, more than a year before it expired, due to being unable to secure his position in the squad, as well as it being publicly known that Payne was not part of Van Egmond's squad plans.

Bonnyrigg White Eagles
Following his unceremonious axing from Newcastle, Payne signed with Bonnyrigg White Eagles for the 2012 New South Wales Premier League season.

Central Coast Mariners Academy
He scored a goal on his debut for New South Wales Premier League club Central Coast Mariners Academy, in 3–1 loss to Sutherland Sharks on 3 February.

Return to Manly
Payne returned to Manly United, signing on for a fourth time. He would play a large part in Manly United's 2014 Waratah Cup run in which they made the Grand Final against fellow NSW NPL 1 club Blacktown City.  Payne scored a brace, however this didn't prevent Manly from crashing to a heavy 6–2 defeat at Lambert Park. Manly United also qualified for the inaugural 2014 FFA Cup in which they were drawn against fellow NSW NPL1 side Sydney Olympic at Cromer Park. Manly lost 3–1, despite Payne opening the scoring in the 10th minute.

East Bengal
On 1 February 2017, Payne moved abroad, and signed for Indian I-League club East Bengal. He came as a replacement for Kyrgyzstani Ildar Amirov, who was released by the club and hence completed their foreigner's quota. On 15 February, he made his debut for the club in a 1–1 draw against Shillong Lajong. He found a shot in the 47th minute of the match which was deflected by the opposition goalkeeper Vishal Kaith. In a match against the same club on 4 March, he scored a brace, scoring in the 9th and the 33rd minute of a 2–1 victory which allowed the club to regain the top spot of the league table. Three days later, he scored in a 2–1 defeat against Churchill Brothers. On 3 May, he was released by the club, ahead of its Federation Cup campaign.

A-League career statistics
(Correct as of 22 February 2015)

Honours

Club
Sydney FC:
A-League Premiership: 2009–2010
A-League Championship: 2009–2010

Sydney United:
Waratah Cup: 2016

References

External links
 North Queensland Fury profile

1990 births
Living people
Sydney FC players
Newcastle Jets FC players
A-League Men players
Australian soccer players
Australia youth international soccer players
Australia under-20 international soccer players
Bonnyrigg White Eagles FC players
Central Coast Mariners Academy players
Sydney United 58 FC players
East Bengal Club players
National Premier Leagues players
I-League players
Australian expatriate soccer players
Australian expatriate sportspeople in India
Expatriate footballers in India
Association football forwards
People from Gosford
Sportsmen from New South Wales
Soccer players from New South Wales